The New Zealand Air Line Pilots' Association (NZALPA) is a trade union in New Zealand. It represents more than 2000 members, including more than 1600 pilots and flight instructors and 340 air traffic controllers.

The NZALPA is affiliated with the  International Federation of Air Line Pilots' Associations and the International Federation of Air Traffic Controllers' Associations.

External links
 NZALPA official site.

Airline pilots' trade unions
International Federation of Air Line Pilots' Associations
Transport trade unions in New Zealand
Trade unions established in 1946
Aviation organisations based in New Zealand